When Pigs Have Wings is a 2011 French-German-Belgian comedy film directed by Sylvain Estibal.

Plot 
One day Jaafar, a fortuneless Palestinian fisherman, catches a Vietnamese pig in his fishing nets. Torn between his Muslim faith and his desire to improve the lives of his wife and himself, pay debts and the reality of the conflict, Jaafar decides to undertake a most unusual trade with a young Russian-Israeli settler, Yelena. She raises pigs and - having no male pig of her own - she asks Jafaar to bring him the seed of his pig.

Cast 
 Sasson Gabai as Jafaar
 Baya Belal as Fatima
 Myriam Tekaïa as Yelena
 Gassan Abbas as Barber
 Khalifa Natour as Hussein
 Uri Gabay as Netsah
 Bashir Wakil as Walid
 Michael Sciortino as Rabbi
 Manuel Cauchi as Abo-Zouhair
 Ulrich Tukur as The UN Officer

Production
The film was shot in Malta.

Accolades

References

External links 

2011 films
French comedy films
2011 comedy films
German comedy films
Belgian comedy films
Best First Feature Film César Award winners
2011 directorial debut films
2010s French films
2010s German films